The Charles W. Stockey Centre for the Performing Arts is a performance hall and sports museum in Parry Sound, Ontario, Canada. It is the primary performance venue for the annual Festival of the Sound summer classical music festival. The centre is named for Charles W. Stockey, an early and enthusiastic supporter and board member of the Festival of the Sound.

Facilities
The centre sits on a 1.5-hectare (3.5-acre) site on a peninsula where the Seguin River flows into Parry Sound on Georgian Bay and adjacent to the town's harbour area. The building has 2,500 square metres (27,000 square feet) of floor space. It includes a 480-seat music hall with acoustics by Artec Consultants and the Bobby Orr Hall of Fame, celebrating the Parry Sound native and ice hockey legend Bobby Orr. The centre was designed to look and feel like a Georgian Bay cottage; wood is used extensively for structural and decorative purposes.

References

External links

Bobby Orr Hall of Fame

Parry Sound, Ontario
Concert halls in Canada
Ice hockey museums and halls of fame
Event venues established in 2003
Museums established in 2003
Museums in Parry Sound District
Sports museums in Canada
Buildings and structures in Parry Sound District
Tourist attractions in Parry Sound District
2003 establishments in Ontario